Joseph Hoffmann or Josef Hoffmann (the surname spelled with a double f) may refer to:

 Josef Hoffmann (1870–1956), Austrian architect
 Josef Hoffmann (footballer) (born 1978), Czech footballer
 Joseph L. Hoffmann, American professor of law
 R. Joseph Hoffmann (born 1957), American historian

See also
Joseph Hofmann (disambiguation), the surname spelled with a single f
Joseph Hoffman (1909–1997), American screenwriter
Joseph F. Hoffman (born 1925), American scientist